James Lesesne Wells (November 2, 1902 – January 20, 1993) was an African-American graphic artist and painter associated with the Harlem Renaissance. He was an influential art professor at Howard University from 1929 to 1968 and is considered a pioneer in modern art education.

Early life and education

Wells was born on November 2, 1902, in Atlanta, Georgia. His father was a Baptist minister and his mother taught school. When he was young, his family moved to Florida. Wells's first experience in art was assisting his mother with her kindergarten art class. When Wells was thirteen years old, he won two prizes in art at the Florida State Fair, a first prize in painting and a second prize in woodworking. Wells went on to attend Lincoln University in Pennsylvania, and later attended Columbia University in New York City, majoring in art studies. Wells later studied art at the National Academy of Design.

Career

Early in his career, Wells was primarily a graphic artist. He worked with block printing, lithography and etching. He created graphic illustrations for books, journals, and other publications, including the illustrations for a poetry collection of Marianne Moore and history periodicals of the Association for the Study of Afro-American Life and History. In 1929, Wells was hired as a crafts instructor at Howard University in Washington D.C. He taught block printing, ceramics, clay modeling and sculpture. Two years later, Well convinced the university's College of Fine Arts  to offer classes in linoleum printmaking. Wells was known for his inventive and modern printmaking.  He was an influential teacher and mentor to young artists during his career, including prominent sculptor Elizabeth Catlett and accomplished printmaker Stephanie Pogue.

After 1931, Wells gained recognition as a painter. Many of his paintings were shown at the Phillips Memorial Gallery in Washington D.C., included with the William Harmon Foundation traveling exhibitions  and exhibited in many museums and art galleries worldwide. Wells's early work was inspired by the work of German Expressionist woodcut artists. He also was fascinated with abstract cubism and African sculpture.  During the Depression, Wells was director of a summer arts program in a Harlem nightclub. His art assistants included Charles Alston, Jacob Lawrence,  and Georgette Seabrooke.

In the early 1930s, influenced by the widespread economic hardship of the Great Depression, Wells made a decision to focus on art that was more affordable. From that point on, he created art that was reproducible: lithographs, woodcuts and etchings. His new work reflected his interest in the African-American experience, and often portrayed workers from all cultures and ethnicity.

After World War II, Wells spent a year working in Stanley William Hayter's Atelier 17 studio in New York City.
During the 1950s, Wells continued to teach art at Howard University, and also continued to create art and exhibit his work. Wells was actively involved in the civil rights movement of the 1960s, protesting separate lunch counters and advocating for hiring black policemen in New York City.

Wells was a prominent artist in Washington, D.C., for sixty years.  He retired from teaching in 1968, but continued to work into his eighties. in 1973, Fisk University held a one-man show of Well's work. In 1980, Wells was awarded the Presidential Citation for Lifelong Contribution to American art by President Jimmy Carter. In 1986, a retrospective exhibition of his work was held at the Washington Project for the Arts. The exhibition was titled "Sixty Years in Art".

Wells died in Washington, D.C., on January 20, 1993.

Awards
 Harmon Foundation, Gold Medal, Flight into Egypt, 1931
 Smithsonian Institution, First Prize, Religious Art Exhibition, 1958
 Presidential Citation for Lifelong Contribution to American art, 1980

References

External links
James Wells collection at the Smithsonian
James Wells at the National Gallery of Art
 

1902 births
1993 deaths
20th-century African-American painters
20th-century American painters
Artists from Washington, D.C.
Columbia University alumni
Lincoln University (Missouri) alumni